Calystegia lucana is a species of plant in the family Convolvulaceae.

Sources

References 

lucana
Flora of Malta